John Morris (5 June 1831 – 9 December 1921) was an Australian cricketer. He played one first-class match for New South Wales in 1858/59.

See also
 List of New South Wales representative cricketers

References

External links
 

1831 births
1921 deaths
Australian cricketers
New South Wales cricketers
Cricketers from Sydney